The 2010 FIM Nice Italian Speedway Grand Prix was the ninth race of the 2010 Speedway Grand Prix season. It took place on 11 September at the Pista Olimpia Terenzano in Terenzano, Italy.

The Italian Grand Prix was won by World Championship leader Tomasz Gollob, who become 2010 World Champion. Gollob won last year SGP also. Tomasz Gollob beat Chris Harris, Greg Hancock and Nicki Pedersen in the final heat.

Riders 
The Speedway Grand Prix Commission nominated Mattia Carpanese as Wild Card, and Mattia Cavicchioli and Andrea Maida both as Track Reserves. Injured Emil Sayfutdinov will be replaced by second Qualified Substitutes rider Davey Watt. The Draw was made on September 24 by Nicola Turello, Mayor of Pozzuolo del Friuli.
 (3)  Emil Sayfutdinov → (20)  Davey Watt

Heat details

Heat after heat 
 Pedersen, Bjerre, Andersen, Jonsson
 Harris, Hampel, Woffinden, Carpanese (F4)
 Watt, Zetterström, Lindgren, Crump
 Hancock, Holder, Gollob, Holta
 Hancock, Zetterström, Pedersen, Carpanese
 Holta, Watt, Hampel, Andersen (X)
 Crump, Harris, Jonsson, Holder
 Gollob, Lindgren, Woffinden, Bjerre
 Gollob, Hampel, Pedersen, Crump (R/start)
 Lindgren, Andersen, Carpanese, Holder (F3x)
 Jonsson, Woffinden, Zetterström, Holta (R4)
 Harris, Hancock, Bjerre, Watt
 Harris, Holta, Pedersen, Lindgren
 Andersen, Crump, Woffinden, Hancock (F2x)
 Gollob, Jonsson, Watt, Carpanese
 Holder, Zetterström, Hampel, Bjerre
 Pedersen, Holder, Woffinden, Watt
 Gollob, Andersen, Harris, Zetterström
 Hampel, Jonsson, Hancock, Lindgren
 Holta, Crump, Bjerre, Carpanese
 Semi-Finals:
 Gollob, Pedersen, Holta, Jonsson
 Hancock, Harris, Hampel, Andersen
 The Final:
 Gollob (6 pts), Harris (4 pts), Hancock (2 pts), Pedersen (0 pts)

The intermediate classification

See also 
 Motorcycle speedway

References 

Italy
Speedway Grand Prix of Italy